Timothy John Laker (born November 27, 1969) is an American professional baseball catcher and coach. He was most recently the hitting coach for the Seattle Mariners of Major League Baseball (MLB).  He played in MLB for the Montreal Expos, Baltimore Orioles, Tampa Bay Devil Rays, Pittsburgh Pirates, and Cleveland Indians from 1992 through 2006.

Early life
Laker was born in Encino, California and graduated from Simi Valley High School in Simi Valley, California. He played college baseball at Oxnard Community College in Oxnard, California.

Career
The Montreal Expos selected Laker in the sixth round of the 1988 Major League Baseball draft. During his professional baseball career, Laker played for the Baltimore Orioles, Cleveland Indians, Montreal Expos, Pittsburgh Pirates, and Tampa Bay Devil Rays.

Mitchell Report 
Laker was named in the Mitchell Report, which detailed anabolic steroid use in MLB, on December 13, 2007. As a current ball club employee, Laker was required to consent to an interview, in which he admitted to purchasing Deca-Durabolin and testosterone from Kirk Radomski from 1995 to 1999.  Laker claimed he was introduced to Radomski by teammate David Segui. In March 2008, Laker admitted regretting his decision to take performance-enhancing drugs stating, "I made a poor decision, a mistake, and all I can do is ask for forgiveness and move on."

Coaching and managing 
Laker first managed the Mahoning Valley Scrappers, the Cleveland Indians' Short-Season A affiliate, in 2007.  He led the New York–Penn League side to a 37-37 record.  However, after just one season, he was moved to the position of "roving catching instructor" within the Indians organization and replaced by Travis Fryman.  Laker cited health concerns related to colitis, as the reason for the change.

In December , Laker was named the manager of the Double-A West Tenn Diamond Jaxx of the Southern League, an affiliate of the Seattle Mariners.

Laker became hitting coach for the Chicago White Sox triple-A affiliate the Charlotte Knights for the 2011 season. In 2016, he was the hitting coach for the Akron Rubber Ducks in the Cleveland Indians minor league system.

In December 2016, Laker was named assistant hitting coach of the Arizona Diamondbacks for the 2017 season.

The Seattle Mariners announced their hiring of Laker as their hitting coach for the 2019 season.

On November 15, 2021, the Mariners announced that Laker declined the club's offer to return as its hitting coach.

See also

 List of Major League Baseball players named in the Mitchell Report

References

External links

Tim Laker at Baseball Almanac

1969 births
Living people
American expatriate baseball players in Canada
American sportspeople in doping cases
Arizona Diamondbacks coaches
Baltimore Orioles players
Baseball coaches from California
Baseball players from California
Buffalo Bisons (minor league) players
Cleveland Indians players
Major League Baseball catchers
Major League Baseball hitting coaches
Minor league baseball managers
Montreal Expos players
Nashville Sounds players
Oxnard Condors baseball players
People from Simi Valley, California
People from Encino, Los Angeles
Pittsburgh Pirates players
Seattle Mariners coaches
Sportspeople from Oxnard, California
Sportspeople from Ventura County, California
Tampa Bay Devil Rays players
Durham Bulls players
Harrisburg Senators players
Jamestown Expos players
Ottawa Lynx players
Rochester Red Wings players
Rockford Expos players
West Palm Beach Expos players